Catarina Sarmento e Castro (born 1970) is a Portuguese jurist and politician. As a member of the Portuguese Socialist Party (PS), she became a deputy in the Portuguese Assembly of the Republic in the January 2022 Portuguese legislative election, representing the Leiria District. Between 2019 and 2022 she served as Secretary of State for Human Resources and Former Combatants. A professor in the Faculty of Law at the University of Coimbra, she has also served as a judge in the Constitutional Court. She was appointed Minister of Justice in March 2022, following the 2022 Portuguese legislative election, when the PS won an overall majority.

Early life and education
Catarina Teresa Rola Sarmento e Castro was born in Coimbra on 16 May 1970. Her father was Osvaldo Alberto do Rosário Sarmento e Castro, a former Socialist Party deputy in the Assembly of the Republic. She obtained undergraduate and master's degrees, as well as a PhD, from the Faculty of Law at the University of Coimbra and also studied for a postgraduate diploma at the Université catholique de Louvain in Belgium, with a dissertation entitled The notion of victim in the European Convention of the Rights of Man.

Career
Sarmento e Castro has been teaching at the University of Coimbra since 1999 and is now an assistant professor. Courses she has taught have included constitutional law and political science; police law; human rights; database protection; administrative courts; public procurement; and labour law. She has addressed these issues in various publications. She has also taught at the NOVA University Lisbon, the University of Lisbon and the Catholic University of Portugal.

Among her other roles, Sarmento e Castro has been a member of the advisory board of the Attorney General's Office and a member of the Superior Council of Administrative and Fiscal Courts. In 2010 she was elected to be a judge at the Constitutional Court, for a term of nine years. She has also been a member of the National Data Protection Commission. On 26 October 2019, she became the new Secretary of State for Human Resources and Former Combatants in the Ministry of National Defence.

Sarmento e Castro was elected to the Portuguese National Assembly in the January 2022 election. Standing for the Socialist Party (PS) she was third on the list of PS candidates for the Leiria District, in which the PS won five seats. Nationally, the PS won an overall majority of seats. Subsequently, she was appointed as Minister of Justice.

References

1970 births
Living people
Socialist Party (Portugal) politicians
Members of the Assembly of the Republic (Portugal)
Women members of the Assembly of the Republic (Portugal)
University of Coimbra alumni
Academic staff of the University of Coimbra
Portuguese jurists
Women government ministers of Portugal
Female justice ministers